Aeolosma is a genus of moths of the family Crambidae. It contains only one species, Aeolosma celata, which is found on Java.

References

Pyraustinae
Taxa named by Edward Meyrick
Monotypic moth genera
Moths of Indonesia
Crambidae genera